Keolis Nederland is a public transport company operating bus and passenger train services in the Netherlands. Originally created as Syntus and owned by Connexxion, Keolis and Nederlandse Spoorwegen, since 2012 Keolis Nederland has been a 100% subsidiary of Keolis. Syntus is an acronym for Synergy between Train and Bus.

History

In 1991 Geldersche Streekvervoer Maatschappij (GSM) and the Dutch Railways started a transport integration project called Integratie Gelderland Oost. Integration between train and bus was the main goal. GSM later merged with Gemeentelijk Vervoerbedrijf Arnhem to form Gelderse Vervoersmaatschappij.

In 1999 Syntus commenced rail operations, Connexxion, Keolis and Nederlandse Spoorwegen each owning one-third. In 2007 Connexxion's share was purchased by Keolis and Nederlandse Spoorwegen. In 2012 Keolis purchased Nederlandse Spoorwegen's 50% share.

In October 2017, Syntus was rebranded Keolis Nederland with a new visual identity.

Visgraatmodel
Syntus propagates synergy, which is based on a so-called 'visgraatmodel' (fish bone model). In this model train service represent the backbones. Bus services represent the spokes that feed train services. After a while other public transport companies like Arriva and Veolia Transport copied the model.

Operations
In 2005, Syntus briefly operated a cross border service into Germany from Arnhem to Emmerich.

From December 2006 until December 2013, Syntus operated the Almelo to Mariënberg rail concession under sub-contract to Connexxion.

In August 2010, Syntus commenced an eight-year contract to operate services in Overijssel. In December 2010, it commenced a 10-year contract to operate services in Gelderland. In December 2016, it commenced a seven-year contract to operate services in Utrecht.

In December 2017, Keolis Nederland has commenced a ten-year contract to operate bus services in Almere. In the same month, it has commenced a 15-year contract to operate rail services in the province of Overijssel from Zwolle to Enschede and Zwolle to Kampen. These will be operated by 16 Stadler Flirts.

Branding
Syntus' corporate identity consisted of the colors yellow, white and blue. Every region has its own identity incorporated in the corporate identity. The Syntus brand was be retired in 2017 and replaced by the Keolis brand.

References

External links

Deventer
Keolis
Nederlandse Spoorwegen
Companies based in Overijssel
Railway companies of the Netherlands
Transdev
Transport companies established in 1999
Transport in the Netherlands
1999 establishments in the Netherlands